Ikolo is an administrative ward in the Kyela district of the Mbeya Region of Tanzania. In 2016 the Tanzania National Bureau of Statistics report there were 5,665 people in the ward, from 5,140 in 2012.

Villages / vitongoji 
The ward has 3 villages and 16 vitongoji.

 Ikolo
 Bugoloka
 Busona
 Ibungu
 Lupando
 Mbimbi
 Mbondela
 Ndobo
 Nyelele
 Lupembe
 Lugombo
 Lupembe
 Muungano
 Bunyongala "A"
 Bunyongala "B"
 Kyimo
 Masyabala
 Mwigo
 Njikula

References 

Wards of Mbeya Region